Mandrake is the fifth album by German power metal band Edguy, released in 2001. It is a varied album, exploring many styles of the power metal genre. It was their last studio album for AFM Records. They later signed a contract with Nuclear Blast.

In 2017, Loudwire ranked it as the 20th best power metal album of all time.

Track listing
All music by Tobias Sammet unless otherwise noted. All lyrics by Sammet

 "Tears of a Mandrake" – 7:12
 "Golden Dawn" (Jens Ludwig, Sammet) – 6:07
 "Jerusalem" (Ludwig, Sammet) – 5:27
 "All the Clowns" – 4:48
 "Nailed to the Wheel" (Ludwig, Sammet) – 5:40 
 "The Pharaoh" – 10:37
 "Wash Away the Poison" – 4:40
 "Fallen Angels" – 5:13
 "Painting on the Wall" – 4:36
 "Save Us Now" – 4:34
 "The Devil and the Savant" (limited edition bonus track) – 5:26
 "Wings of a Dream 2001" (limited edition bonus track) – 5:03

Personnel
Band members
Tobias Sammet – lead and backing vocals, keyboards, organ
Jens Ludwig – guitars, backing vocals
Dirk Sauer – guitars, backing vocals
Tobias 'Eggi' Exxel – bass, backing vocals
Felix Bohnke – drums

Additional musicians
Ralf Zdiarstek, Markus Schmitt, Daniel Schmitt, Rob Rock – backing vocals
Frank Tischer – piano on track 7

Production
Norman Meieritz – engineer
Mikko Karmila – mixing
Mika Jussila – mastering

References

Edguy albums
2001 albums
AFM Records albums
Albums with cover art by Jean-Pascal Fournier